1998 Belarusian First League was the eighth season of 2nd level football championship in Belarus. It started in April and ended in November 1998.

Team changes from 1997 season
Two best teams of 1997 Belarusian First League (Gomel and BATE Borisov) were promoted to Belarusian Premier League. They were initially replaced by two lowest-placed teams of 1997 Premier League (Torpedo-Kadino Mogilev and Shakhtyor Soligorsk).

Two teams that finished at the bottom of last season's table (Lokomotiv Vitebsk and Stroitel Starye Dorogi) relegated to the Second League. They were replaced by two best teams of 1997 Second League (Dinamo-Energo Vitebsk and Svisloch-Krovlya Osipovichi as the winners of their respective groups).

Following the dissolution of two Premier League clubs (Transmash Mogilev and Ataka Minsk) BFF decided to reinstall both previously relegated clubs (Torpedo-Kadino Mogilev and Shakhtyor Soligorsk) in Premier League. To replace them, Polesye Mozyr Raion and ZLiN Gomel (2nd and 3rd teams of 1997 Second League Group B) were additionally promoted. Veras Nesvizh (Second League Group A runners-up) were offered promotion ahead of ZLiN Gomel but declined.

Before the start of the season Kardan-Flyers Grodno were renamed to Belcard Grodno, Dnepr Rogachev to FC Rogachev and Dinamo-Energo Vitebsk to Dinamo-Energogaz Vitebsk

Overview
Two best teams of the season (Lida and Svisloch-Krovlya Osipovichi) were promoted to the Premier League. Two lowest placed teams (Veino Mogilev Raion and Belenergostroy Beloozyorsk) were initially relegated to the Second League. Belenergostroy Beloozyorsk disbanded at the end of the season and never played in First of Second league again. Belcard Grodno, who finished 8th, also disbanded, and as a result, Veino Mogilev Raion were saved from relegation.

Teams and locations

League table

Top goalscorers

See also
1998 Belarusian Premier League
1997–98 Belarusian Cup
1998–99 Belarusian Cup

External links
RSSSF

Belarusian First League seasons
2
Belarus
Belarus